The Fortaleza do Monte (Portuguese for Mount Fortress, also Monte Forte; officially Fortaleza de Nossa Senhora do Monte de São Paulo, in ; ; Cantonese Yale: daaih paau yìh) is a fort in Santo António in Macau. It is the historical military centre of Macau. The fort forms part of the "Historic Centre of Macau" and is a UNESCO World Heritage Site.

The fort was built between 1617 and 1626 on the 52-metre tall Mount Hill, located directly east of the Ruins of Saint Paul's. It was constructed to protect the properties of the Jesuits (mainly Portuguese Jesuits) in Macau, especially from pirates. Later, the fort was taken over by the Portuguese colonial governor and the relevant authorities for the defence of Macau.

The fort occupies an area of roughly 8,000 square metres. Thirty-two muzzle-loading cannon were placed around the fort's walls, and the two corners of the southeastern fort wall have small watchtowers. The fort proved crucial in successfully holding off the attempted Dutch invasion of Macau in 1622.

The fort remained a restricted military area until 1965 when the barracks in the fort were converted into a weather observatory and the fort was opened to the public. The observatory ceased its function and was relocated to Taipa in 1996 before it was demolished to make way for the Museum of Macau, which was officially opened on 19 April 1998. The tree-covered park at the top of the fort has a panoramic view of the mainland area of Macau.

Apart from being a fortress, it has served various functions:
 The first residence of the governors of Macau (in 1623 and in 1740).
 The base for two companies of the Portuguese Prince Regent Battalion to act as a police force from 1810 to 1841.
 A weather observatory of the Meteorological Department of Portuguese Macau (from 1966 to 1996).
 The Museum of Macau (1998 to present).

Gallery

See also
 Guia Fortress, another Portuguese fort in Macau
 List of oldest buildings and structures in Macau
 List of tourist attractions in Macau
 List of Jesuit sites

Notes

References

External links

Mount Fortress - Macau World Heritage website by the Cultural Affairs Bureau

Buildings and structures completed in 1626
Forts in Macau
Portuguese forts
Historic Centre of Macau
Urban public parks in Macau
Landmarks in Macau
Portuguese Macau
Chinese architectural history
1626 establishments in China
1626 establishments in the Portuguese Empire
17th-century establishments in Macau
Portuguese colonial architecture in China